Hotel Cæsar is a Norwegian soap opera that aired on TV 2 from 24 October 1998 until 14 December 2017. From the start in 1998, the show was broadcast Monday to Friday, except during the autumn of 2006, where the show was broadcast Monday to Thursday only, and from 2010 until 15 December 2016, the show was again broadcast Monday to Thursday on TV 2. From 2 January 2017, the show started being broadcast online only, through TV 2's web player TV 2 Sumo. The show was cancelled later in 2017, and the last episode was published on TV 2 Sumo 14 December 2017. It was created by Swedish duo Peter Emanuel Falck and Christian Wikander. The show consists of a total of 3,123 episodes, making it the longest running drama in television in Scandinavia. Hotel Cæsar is the second longest running drama in television in the Nordics after Finnish soap opera Salatut elämät (1999–).

Plot
The storylines are centered around a fictional hotel in Oslo, its employees, and the Anker-Hansen family. From the start, CEO and widower Georg Anker-Hansen (Toralv Maurstad) was one of the most central figures in the series and his romance with the escort girl Ninni Krogstad (Henriette Lien) was the main story. After a year Georg died of incurable cancer in the pancreas, and Ninni inherited the entire corporation, which led to major conflicts with Georg's dominating mother, Astrid (Sossen Krohg), and especially Georg's children, Juni (Anette Hoff), Jens August (Kim Kolstad), and Julie (Elin Sogn).

So far, the series was mostly inspired by the history of Janni Spies, where Janni Brodersen married the much older Danish tourism king Simon Spies, and inherited millions when he died. It gave the idea to the hotel-owner Georg Anker-Hansen and the escort girl Ninni Krogstad.

The story of Georg's daughter Juni was also pretty much in the center in the beginning, due to her alcoholism. It received great attention in Norwegian media. The show received even more attention when the half-siblings Jens-August (Kim Kolstad) and Charlotte Iversen (Kristin Frogner) began a relationship without knowing that they were siblings.

Later, the series focused on topics such as racism, kidnapping, rape, abortion, trafficking, drugs, pyromania, homosexuality, murder and other controversial topics.

In autumn 2004, episode No. 1000 of the series was sent, where Toralv Maurstad made a guest appearance as Georg in some of the characters dreams.

In January 2006, the series changed its genre and appeared as a more innovative and modern soap with more action, humor, sex, violence and drama. The show received massive media publicity because of its controversial content and early prime time. After the sudden change in the series, the viewing rates decreased, and this resulted as of January 2007, that the show gradually returned to its old style.

Years later it was discovered that Georg's deceased wife, Ingeborg Anker-Hansen, had an affair with Harald Hilldring, which resulted in the birth of Julie Anker-Hansen, who was the artist and the outsider of the family. She learned about this through her mother's diaries. Julie also claimed Georg responsible for her mother's illness, and among her siblings, she's the one who has the smallest problem about being against her family's opinions.

At the start of the series, Jens August came out of prison, having served a prison term for killing a young man driving under the influence of alcohol. He also had a past with his father's new girlfriend, Ninni, and the relationship between Jens August and Ninni was always tense.

In the summer-cliffhanger of 2007, Jens August returned to the series, after being deserted on an island for two years. The plane was sabotaged by an assassin sent by Scott Wallace, brother of Rolv Espevoll. Rolv, who was introduced to the Anker-Hansens in 1998. He had a brief affair with Juni during his 4 years working at the hotel. In 2002, he was set up for a murder, and later found guilty and sent to prison. He was released in 2006, where he in a short time with his brother Scott kicked out the Anker-Hansens of the hotel and their own concern. Throughout the few months they were in charge, Scott and Rolv developed a tense and hatred relationship. After some tense weeks, Scott wanted to get rid of Rolv, and planted a bag of cocaine in his hotel-room. Since Rolv recently was released from jail, this was a crucial move from Scott. After an anonymous call by him to the police, Rolv was arrested and was most likely to be convicted for drug-dealing. Rolv figured out that Scott was behind it all. And at the day of his trail, he ran off from the court. He visited Juni at Ankerseteren, gagged her, stole a rifle and ran down to the hotel, where he started shooting in the lobby. He killed 20 people, including 2 people who held weapons too. Daphne wanted revenge from her ex for leaving her. When she pointed the gun at him, Rolv waited behind and shot her. The other one wielding a weapon was Julian, who was threatening his girlfriend, Benedicte, who've he had molested recently. Rolv ran into Julian and Benedicte when Julian was about to shoot her. In a cheeky manner, Rolv pointed the rifle on Julian, asking him to apologize to Benedicte for treating her bad. Nevertheless, Rolv shot Julian, who died instantly. Ironically then, Rolv saved 2 people from getting killed. He then went up to the office, where he pushed Scott out on the roof and talked straight out about everything he hated about him. Scott was already shot in his arm, and was not able to defend himself. Rolv ended up killing himself in the end.

In November 2007, June Anker-Hansen and Jens August Anker-Hansen were about to sell Virtual Window, a project developed by businesswoman, Nadia Selam-Tefari, who worked at Cæsar. Junis boyfriend at the moment, Magnus Falsen, presented the Virtual Window to his lodge, Vox Populi, which seemed positive to the project.

Many new main characters arrived in 2008, including Gaute Ormåsen who came 2nd in the Norwegian Idol in 2003. He played the role of the musician and bartender Marius Nordheim. Per Christian Ellefsen joined the cast as the businessman Tom Ivar Johansen. In addition, viewers were introduced to his two daughters, Cecilie and Cathrine.

In November 2008, Tom Ivar died of bone cancer in addition to a fall from the main staircase at Hotel Cæsar, after accidentally being pushed down by his daughter Cathrine. Cathrine admitted, when Tom Ivar was comatose, that she hoped he would die. Cathrine felt that she always was his second daughter after Cecilie, who he admired and loved openly.

In April 2009, Victoria Lunde, Junis daughter, came back to the series after many years in Belgium. She had turned into an alcoholic, which she probably inherited from his mother. Initially, Victoria held this hidden, but after several incidents throughout the fall of 2009, Juni figured out that her daughter needed help.

In the spring of 2009, Cathrine broke off from the Anker-Hansen Group, and started her own hotel chain, the Black Diamond. Jens August joined her after having a serious conflict with his family. Nevertheless, he returns to his family later.

In October 2009, Jens August's wife, Liv died, when she was hit by a car. Weeks later, she appeared in Jens Augusts "visions". Juni's ex-husband and Victoria's father, Ragnar Lunde also had a guest role in the autumn of 2009. He had married an Asian woman and converted to Buddhism. When he left, Victoria joined him to go to rehab back in Brussels, Belgium.

In November the same year, Jens August and Ninni's son, Georg jr., or "Goggen", returned to Norway after being sent to boarding school in Switzerland at a young age. He later started a relationship with Runa Jørgensen, step-daughter of his own uncle, Svein. He was Ninni's brother, and had at the moment a rocky relationship to Goggen.

In February 2010, Astrid's centenary was celebrated in the 2000th episode of the show. At the end of this episode, Astrid got a stroke, and it turned out that she had cerebral hemorrhage. She survives, but loses her voice capability. However, Astrid died a month later.

This spring, Juni found out that Ingeborg is not her mother, as she thought over the years. Her real mother was her former nanny, Dagny Dallimore (who came into the series in late 2009). Before Juni was born, her family thought Ingeborg was not able to have a child. Therefore, Dagny said yes to carry Georg's baby. Astrid, Ingeborg and Georg set it up to make Juni think she was Ingeborg's daughter. Dagny was allowed to continue meeting her daughter as her nanny. But when Astrid and Ingeborg thought Juni and Dagny were too close, they blackmailed Dagny into leave the country. She moved to Australia, where she married a priest and got another daughter, Rose. Dagny told Juni about this. She also told Juni that Rose had a rough patch in her life, and that she had broken off all her contact to Dagny. Juni decided to go to Australia and find after her. Meanwhile, Junis daughter, Victoria, had completed her treatment in Brussels, returned to Oslo in April 2010.

This spring, Cathrine's hotel chain, Black Diamond, hit bankruptcy as a result when the chain's investor, Elliot Hiltun, was arrested for economic crimes, and thus get all their financial assets frozen.

In the 2010 season finale, a huge fire started during a family dinner at Ankerseteren. Three people, Dagny, Ragnhild and Cecilie, were killed in the fire.

Cast

Current cast

Comings and Goings

Former cast members

References

External links
TV 2's Hotel Cæsar site
TV 2's Hotel Cæsar forum

1998 Norwegian television series debuts
1998 establishments in Norway
Norwegian television soap operas
TV 2 (Norway) original programming
1990s Norwegian television series
Television series set in hotels